Musical structure may refer to:

Musical form
Song structure (popular music)
Upper structure